Hodophylax is a genus of robber flies in the family Asilidae. There are at least four described species in the genus Hodophylax.

Species
These four species belong to the genus Hodophylax:
 Hodophylax aridus James, 1933 i c g b
 Hodophylax basingeri Pritchard, 1938 i c g
 Hodophylax halli Wilcox, 1961 i c g
 Hodophylax tolandi Wilcox, 1961 i c g
Data sources: i = ITIS, c = Catalogue of Life, g = GBIF, b = Bugguide.net

References

Further reading

 
 
 

Asilidae
Articles created by Qbugbot
Asilidae genera